Colonel Greene may refer to:

Christopher Greene (1737–1781), American soldier
William Cornell Greene (1851–1911), American soldier
Frederick Stuart Greene (1870–1939), American soldier